Swiss Locomotive and Machine Works (German Schweizerische Lokomotiv- und Maschinenfabrik; French Société Suisse pour la Construction de Locomotives et de Machines; or for both, SLM) was a railway equipment manufacturer based in Winterthur in Switzerland. Much of the world's mountain railway equipment was constructed by the company.

History
The company was founded in 1871 by the British engineer Charles Brown. SLM built both steam and electric locomotives, including the crocodile type.

From 1992, SLM returned to producing steam locomotives designed around advanced steam technology principles. This included rebuilding DR Class 52.80 locomotive number 52 8055.

In 1998, the cog-railway division was sold to Stadler Rail, and the engineering division, via Adtranz, to Bombardier Transportation. The remaining business was renamed Sulzer-Winpro AG and as part of a management buyout in 2001, was renamed Winpro AG.

The advanced steam division was sold in 2000 to Dampflokomotiv- und Maschinenfabrik AG (Steam Locomotive and Machine Works Ltd), or DLM AG.

In October 2001, the measurement division was sold to PROSE AG.

Winpro AG was sold on 7 September 2005 to Stadler Rail.

Preserved SLM Locomotives

Finland

France

India

Switzerland

United Kingdom

Indonesia

See also
 SLM factories
 Jakob Buchli - a railway pioneer with the SLM

Gallery

References

Companies based in Winterthur
Cultural property of national significance in the canton of Zürich
Locomotive manufacturers of Switzerland
 
Swiss companies established in 1871
Manufacturing companies established in 1871